Pharaju is a Janya rāgam in Carnatic music, a musical scale of South Indian classical music.

It is janyam of 15th Melakarta Raga Mayamalavagowla. 

There is a famous javali Cheline netlu, thillana by Patnam Subramanya Iyer, Navagraha krithi on Shukra by Muttuswamy Dikshitar and a Syama Sastry composition too.

External links

Meduri srinivas
 http://www.medieval.org/music/world/carnatic/lyrics/TKG/mahalingeshvaram.html

Janya ragas